Mont-Joli is a city in the La Mitis Regional County Municipality within the Bas-Saint-Laurent region of Quebec, Canada. It is the county seat. The city is located east of Rimouski near the south shore of the Saint Lawrence River.

History
In 1867, the main condition for New Brunswick and Nova-Scotia entering into the Canadian Confederation was, to be linked to the rest of the country by the railway. In 1868, work began on the Intercolonial Railway and the authorities decided to have the railway turn at Saint-Octave-de-Métis in Gaspésie. However, this village, because of its rugged landscape, was not suitable to receive the train station and maintenance shops. The engineers turned to the higher 2nd farming rank of Sainte-Flavie, and the train station was named Sainte-Flavie-Station. In 1880, Sainte-Flavie-Station became separate and was named Mont-Joli, the name which the first settlers had used to describe the area.

On 13 June 2001, the neighbouring municipality of Saint-Jean-Baptiste (not to be confused with a different Saint-Jean-Baptiste in the Montérégie region) merged with Mont-Joli.

Demographics 

Transportation

Mont-Joli is the easternmost end of Autoroute 20, whose segment connects with the city of Rimouski.

Mont-Joli Airport is the only airport with scheduled service in the Bas-Saint-Laurent region. Mont-Joli is also served by the Mont-Joli railway station.

Notables
Joseph-Adalbert Landry: One of the inventors of the snowauto, patented in 1923
Bertrand Dandonneau: Inventor of tights
René Dupéré: Composer for Cirque du Soleil
Robert Piché: Airline pilot in Mont-Joli, involved in the 236 Air Transat incident
Donald Dufresne: Ex-NHL hockey player and assistant manager to the Rimouski Océanic
Pierre Labrie: Writer
Micheline Morisset: Writer
Gervais Rioux: Olympic cyclist (Seoul, 1988)
Gaétan D'Amours: Mr. Québec 1960, Mr. Canada 1961, Mr. America 1961, Mr. Universe 1967 (5th place)
Claudine Desrosiers: Researcher for worker relations
Jacques Lelièvre: Karting pilot
Danielle Doyer: Politician
Tommy Gagnon: Musician, music group Delta 20
Maurice Lamontagne: Economist and Canadian Senator

Climate

See also
 List of cities in Quebec

References

External links

City website

Cities and towns in Quebec
Incorporated places in Bas-Saint-Laurent